Jean-Marc Doussain (born 12 February 1991) is a French rugby union fly half.  He plays club rugby for Stade Toulousain and has appeared for the French national U20 side. He made his debut for France with 5 minutes left of the 2011 Rugby World Cup Final, becoming the first player ever to make his Test debut in a Rugby World Cup Final. Doussain wasn't initially named in the squad and was only called up as an injury replacement for David Skrela.

Doussain was born in Sainte-Croix-Volvestre and played for Saint-Girons rugby club before signing for Toulouse in 2007, at the age of 17. His father, Jean Doussain, was also a rugby player, having played at scrum-half for Stade Saint-Gaudinois in the 1980s. Doussain made his first full appearance for Toulouse on 28 November 2009, against Montauban. His current contract commits him to Toulouse until the end of the 2014 season.

References

External links
 ESPN Scrum Profile

1991 births
Living people
Stade Toulousain players
French rugby union players
France international rugby union players
Rugby union scrum-halves
Rugby union players from Toulouse
Lyon OU players
Sportspeople from Ariège (department)